Carmichaelia hollowayi (common name Holloways broom)  is a species of plant in the family Fabaceae. It is found only in the South Island of New Zealand. Its conservation status (2018) is "Nationally Critical" under the New Zealand Threat Classification System.

Description 
Carmichaelia hollowayi is a low-growing shrub (50–60 cm high), first growing as an erect shrub but later its stems trail and spread across the ground.

Taxonomy
The species was first described by George Simpson in 1945. The earliest record in AVH, CHR 45804 was collected by Simpson in 1937 somewhere in Otago.

Habitat
It grows on limestone (which Simpson described as sandstone).

References

External links
Carmichaelia hollowayi occurrence data from Australasian Virtual Herbarium (Note:These points have been intentionally misplaced since this is a sensitive species.)

hollowayi
Flora of New Zealand
Taxa named by George Simpson
Plants described in 1945